Mir Aqa Beyk (also Romanized as Mīr Āqā Beyk and Mīr Āqā Beyg; also known as Āqā Beyk and Āqā Beyg) is a village in Pain Velayat Rural District, in the Central District of Taybad County, Razavi Khorasan Province, Iran. At the 2006 census, its population was 430, in 87 families.

References 

Populated places in Taybad County